Honour and Glory (foaled March 24, 1993 in Kentucky – July 17, 2018) was an American Thoroughbred racehorse who won important races during his career. He was bred by William T. Young's Overbrook Farm and purchased by British businessman and prominent racehorse owner, Michael Tabor.

Retired to stud in the United States, Honour and Glory sired a number of winners including the 2000 American Champion Two-Year-Old Filly, Caressing, winner of the 2000 Breeders' Cup Juvenile Fillies. The Leading First-Crop Sire of 2000, among his other American-born offspring, he sired Blues and Royals, winner of the 2005 UAE Derby.

Honour and Glory was sold to La Mission Stallion Station in Argentina. He stood in that country, where he notably sired 2008 UAE Derby winner, Honour Devil, and also at Wintergreen Stallion Station in Midway, Kentucky.

On July 17, 2018 it was announced that Honour and Glory had died due to complications of a broken femur.

References

External links
 Honour and Glory's pedigree and partial racing stats
 Honour and Glory Thoroughbred Times breeding profile

1993 racehorse births
2018 racehorse deaths
Racehorses bred in Kentucky
Racehorses trained in the United States
Thoroughbred family 16-a
Godolphin Arabian sire line